"Istanbul (Not Constantinople)" is a 1953 novelty song, with lyrics by Jimmy Kennedy and music by Nat Simon. It was written on the 500th anniversary of the fall of Constantinople to the Ottomans. The lyrics humorously refer to the official renaming of the city of Constantinople to Istanbul. The song's original release, performed by The Four Lads, was certified as a gold record. Numerous cover versions have been recorded over the years, most famously a 1990 rock version by They Might Be Giants.

Musical influences
The song is said to be a response to "C-O-N-S-T-A-N-T-I-N-O-P-L-E" recorded in 1928 by Paul Whiteman and His Orchestra.

The Four Lads original version
"Istanbul (Not Constantinople)" was originally recorded by the Canadian vocal quartet The Four Lads on August 12, 1953. This recording was released by Columbia Records as catalog number 40082. It first reached the Billboard magazine charts on October 24, 1953, and it peaked at #10. It was the group's first gold record.

Cover versions

Frankie Vaughan

Frankie Vaughan's 1954 version for HMV reached the UK charts that year with a peak position of No. 11.

Col Joye's Joy Boys

Col Joye's backing band recorded an instrumental version on the Festival Records label, which peaked No. 16 in November 1960 according to the former brand of the ARIA Charts, ending up as No. 95 for the 1961 year-end ranking.

The Big Muffin Serious Band

This group from New Zealand released a cover on their LP "Jabberwocky Goes To Town" in 1987.

They Might Be Giants

One of the best-known versions of "Istanbul (Not Constantinople)" is the cover by the alternative rock band They Might Be Giants (TMBG), who released it on their album Flood in 1990. It was released as the second single from that album in the same year. TMBG's version is at a faster tempo than the original. The music video was featured in the first season of MTV's Liquid Television. TMBG's version of the song is prominently featured in the Tiny Toon Adventures episode "Tiny Toon Music Television", as the soundtrack to a segment featuring Plucky Duck as a private detective hired to find a missing statue. It was also used as the theme in the thriller Black Magic (1992 film) starring Judge Reinhold. In recent years, it appears in the first season of the Netflix series The Umbrella Academy, as well as an ending to an episode of The Simpsons, "Mobile Homer". The single reached number 61 on the UK Singles Chart in 1990. TMBG later recorded an electronic version of the song for their 2011 compilation album, Album Raises New and Troubling Questions.

The Sacados
A Spanish language version called "Estambul" was recorded by Argentine synth-pop trio The Sacados in 1990. The song was included on their debut album "Te pido + respeto" (1990).

Bart & Baker
Electro Swing duo Bart & Baker covered the song for their album "The Jet Lag EP" (2012). Another version called "Istanbul 2016" was included on their curation album "Best Of Electro Swing By Bart & Baker" (2016).

Live performance cover versions
The Duke's Men of Yale, an all-male a cappella group at Yale University, perform the song at the end of most of their concerts. The song has been in the repertoire of the Duke's Men since 1953.

During the 2000s, the song was performed live by Australian Klezmer/Gypsy Jazz band Monsieur Camembert, appearing on the album Live on Stage.

References

1953 songs
1990 EPs
1990 singles
Elektra Records singles
Warner Music Group singles
Swing music
Songs about cities
Songs about Turkey
Songs with lyrics by Jimmy Kennedy
Songs with music by Nat Simon
The Four Lads songs
They Might Be Giants EPs
They Might Be Giants songs
Song recordings produced by Clive Langer
Song recordings produced by Alan Winstanley
Novelty songs